Puruma River (Quechua puruma land fertilized by sowing legumes) is a Bolivian river in the Chuquisaca Department, Oropeza Province, Puruma Municipality. It is an affluent of Río Exaltación whose waters flow to San Pedro River, a right tributary of Río Grande.

The river runs along the little town Puruma.

See also 
 List of rivers of Bolivia
 Maran Mayu

References

Rivers of Chuquisaca Department